Al-Ansar ('the Partisans') was a guerrilla force attached to the Iraqi Communist Party, active between 1979 and 1988.

Early phase

When the alliance between the Communist Party and the Arab Socialist Ba'ath Party ended, a wave of harsh repression against the Communist Party followed. In 1977 the regime launched a crackdown against the communists. A number of communist cadres fled to the Kurdish areas in northern Iraq to escape arrest. By January 1979, the exiled communists had established partisan fighting units. By April 1979, the al-Ansar movement was operational. Headquarters of the partisan units were established in Kirkuk and as-Sulemaniyah, and bases were established in Irbil. Later, bases were also set up in Dohuk and Nineveh. The build-up of al-Ansar did however occur without the full consent of the politburo of the party.

In South Yemen, a number of Iraqi Communist Party cadres began military training before joining the guerrillas in northern Iraq. The training was administered by the South Yemeni government.

Communist Party adopts armed struggle as its line of action
In 1980 partisan newspapers in Arabic, Nahj al-Ansar (نهج الأنصار, 'Path of the Partisans'), and Kurdish, Ribazy Peshmerga, were launched. In November 1981 the Communist Party formally adopted armed struggle as a line of struggle of the party and established up a Central Military Bureau as a unified command to lead the partisan movement. By that time the partisan forces operated throughout the Kurdish provinces of Iraq.

In 1982 a Central Military Council was held clandestinely. It was attended by the Communist Party general secretary, politburo and partisan commanders. The Council set up the overall strategic line of the armed struggle. By this time a decentralized command structure had been adopted, enabling the partisan forces more flexibility in their confrontations with Iraqi government troops.

Pasht Ashan massacre

The Communist Party made a deal with the Patriotic Union of Kurdistan (PUK), one of the two main Kurdish factions. However, only two weeks after the deal with PUK, the Communist Party shifted its alliances to the arch-rival of PUK, the Kurdistan Democratic Party (KDP). This shift of alliance was motivated by the willingness of PUK to reach an agreement with Saddam Hussein's regime. The immediate result of the shift was that al-Ansar was put in the line of fire between the warring Kurdish factions. In May 1983 al-Ansar forces entered the Pasht Ashan area, a zone that both PUK and KDP claimed as part of their sphere of influence. PUK forces attacked the Communist Party headquarters, and massacred 150 al-Ansar fighters and other Communist Party members. A radio station run by the Communist Party was destroyed by the PUK peshmerga. The PUK peshmerga also seized ammunitions and food supplies of al-Ansar. Several Communist Party members, including members of the party politburo, were captured by PUK. After the attack al-Ansar was no longer en effective guerrilla force.

Within the Iraqi Communist Party (Central Command) (a splinter group that had opposed the alliance between the Iraqi Communist Party and the Ba'ath Party), claims were made that the Pasht Ashan massacre had been deliberately provoked by the Communist Party leadership. According to this version of events, the Communist Party leadership would have used the killings to remove oppositional forces inside the party (who called for the holding of a new party congress).

End of the movement
In June 1987 the movement suffered another severe set-back, as over 150 fighters were killed. The report to the 1998 sixth party congress of the Iraqi Communist Party identified that confusion between the politburo and the local guerrilla forces had been the cause of the defeat. As the partisan forces lost their military capacity, they developed into an appendage to the major Kurdish forces, with whom the Communist Party built alliances. The communist partisan forces had de facto come under control of the Kurdish section of the Communist Party.

The June–July 1987 meeting of the Central Committee of the Iraqi Communist Party decided to put the Kurdish section in charge of al-Ansar. In May 1988 the Central Committee decided to dissolve the Central Military Bureau and formalize the transfer of leadership of the partisan forces to the Kurdish section of the party. By this time al-Ansar was largely defunct. According to estimates from the Communist Party, around 1,200 of its fighters were killed during the nine years of armed struggle.

Veterans' Society
In 2004 an organization of veterans of the al-Ansar, Iraqi Communist Partisans Society, was founded at a conference in southern Sweden. The Society has branches both in Iraq and in exile.

See also
Ar-Rashid revolt
Iraqi Armed Revolutionary Resistance
Iraqi opposition (pre-2003)
Toma Tomas

References

Arab militant groups
Communism in Iraq
Defunct communist militant groups
Iraqi Communist Party
Iraqi–Kurdish conflict
Military wings of communist parties
Rebel groups in Iraq